This is a list of musical compositions by the 20th-century Russian composer Sergei Prokofiev.

By genre

Operas
The Giant (1900)
On Desert Islands (1900; unfinished)
A Feast in Time of Plague (1903, rev. 1908–09; unfinished)
Undina (1904–07)
Maddalena, Op. 13 (1911–13; unfinished)
Igrok (The Gambler), Op. 24 (1915–16, rev. 1927); after Fyodor Dostoevsky
The Love for Three Oranges, Op. 33 (1919)
The Fiery Angel, Op. 37 (1919–27)
Semyon Kotko, Op. 81 (1939)
Betrothal in a Monastery, Op. 86 (1940–41)
War and Peace, Op. 91 (1941–52); after Leo Tolstoy
Khan Buzay (1942; unfinished)
The Story of a Real Man, Op. 117 (1947–48)
Distant Seas (1948; unfinished)

Ballets
 Ala i Lolli (1915, abandoned and rewritten as the Scythian Suite)
 Chout / Tale of the Jester, Op. 21 (1915, rev. 1920)
 Trapeze (1924, abandoned and rewritten as the Quintet for Oboe, Clarinet, Violin, Viola and Double Bass)
 Le pas d'acier / The Steel Step, Op. 41 (1926)
 Le fils prodigue / The Prodigal Son, Op. 46 (1929)
 On the Dnieper, Op. 51 (1931)
 Romeo and Juliet, Op. 64 (1935, classified as a Soviet choreodrama, or drambalet)
 Cinderella, Op. 87 (1944)
 Tale of the Stone Flower, Op. 118 (1953)

Incidental music
Egyptian Nights suite, Op. 61 (1934)
Boris Godunov, Op. 70bis (1936)
Eugene Onegin, Op. 71 (1936)
Hamlet, Op. 77 (1937–38)

Film music
Lieutenant Kijé, Op. 60 (1934), also arranged as an orchestral suite (see below)
The Queen of Spades, Op. 70a (1936), after Pushkin
Alexander Nevsky, Op. 78 (1938), film directed by Sergei Eisenstein (also exists in the form of a cantata, see below)
Lermontov (1941)
Kotovsky (1942)
Tonya (1942)
The Partisans in the Ukrainian Steppes (1942)
Ivan the Terrible, Op. 116 (1942–45), film directed by Sergei Eisenstein (also exists in various concert forms arranged by various people)

Symphonies
Symphonies – two juvenile: Symphony (1902) and Symphony (1908)
Symphony No. 1 in D Classical, Op. 25  (1916–17)
Symphony No. 2 in D minor, Op. 40 (1924–25)
Symphony No. 3 in C minor, Op. 44 (1928)
Symphony No. 4 in C (original version), Op. 47 (1929–30)
Symphony No. 5 in B, Op. 100 (1944)
Symphony No. 6 in E minor, Op. 111 (1945–47)
Symphony No. 4 in C (revised version), Op. 112 (1947)
Symphony No. 7 in C minor, Op. 131 (1951–52)
Symphony No. 2 in D minor (revised version), Op. 136 (1953; unrealized)

Orchestral suites
Suites (3) from "Romeo and Juliet"
Suite No. 1, Op. 64bis (1936)
Suite No. 2, Op. 64ter (1936)
Suite No. 3, Op. 101 (1946)
Suites (3) from "Cinderella"
Suite No. 1, Op. 107 (1946)
Suite No. 2, Op. 108 (1946)
Suite No. 3, Op. 109 (1946)
Suites (4) from "The Tale of the Stone Flower"
Wedding Suite, Op. 126 (1951)
Gypsy Fantasy, Op. 127 (1951)
Urals Rhapsody, Op. 128 (1951)
The Mistress of Copper Mountain Op. 129 (1951; unfinished)
Scythian Suite, Op. 20 (from "Ala i Lolli") (1914–15)
Suite from "Chout", Op. 21bis (1920)
Suite from "The Love for Three Oranges", Op. 33bis (1919, rev. 1924)
Vocal Suite from "The Fiery Angel", Op. 37bis (1923; incomplete)
Suite from "Le pas d'acier", Op. 41bis (1926)
Suite from "The Prodigal Son", Op. 46bis (1929)
Suite from "The Gambler" ("Four Portraits and Denouement"), Op. 49 (1931)
Suite from "On the Dnieper", Op. 51bis (1933)
Suite from "Lieutenant Kijé", Op. 60 (1934)
Suite from "Egyptian Nights", Op. 61 (1938)
Suite from "Semyon Kotko", Op. 81bis (1941)
Waltz Suite, Op. 110 (1946) (includes waltzes from "War and Peace," "Cinderella," and "Lermontov")
Summer Night, suite from "Betrothal in a Monastery", Op. 123 (1950)

Other orchestral works
Sinfonietta in A (original version), Op. 5 (1909)
Dreams, Op. 6 (1910)
Autumnal, Op. 8 (1910)
Andante from Piano Sonata No. 4, arranged for orchestra, Op. 29bis (1934)
Overture on Hebrew Themes, Op. 34bis (based on chamber version) (1934)
American Overture, Op. 42 (1926), for 17 instruments
American Overture, Op. 42bis (1928), for full orchestra
Divertissement, Op. 43 (1925–29) (also exists in a piano transcription, see transcriptions for piano below)
Sinfonietta in A (revised version of Op. 5), Op. 48 (1929)
Andante from String Quartet No. 1, arranged for string orchestra, Op. 50bis (1930)
Symphonic Song, Op. 57 (1933)
Russian Overture, Op. 72 (1936) (2 differently orchestrated versions)
Symphonic March, Op. 88 (1941)
The Year 1941, Op. 90 (1941)
Ode to the End of the War, Op. 105 (1945), for winds, 8 harps, 4 pianos, percussion, and double basses
Thirty Years, Op. 113 (1947), festive poem for orchestra
Pushkin Waltzes, Op. 120 (1949)
The Meeting of the Volga and the Don, Op. 130 (1951), festive poem for orchestra

Concertos
Piano:
Piano Concerto No. 1 in D, Op. 10 (1911–12)
Piano Concerto No. 2 in G minor, Op. 16 (1912–13, lost, re-written in 1923)
Piano Concerto No. 3 in C, Op. 26 (1917–21)
Piano Concerto No. 4 in B, Op. 53 (1931), for left hand (written for Paul Wittgenstein)
Piano Concerto No. 5 in G, Op. 55 (1932)
Piano Concerto No. 6, Op. 134 (1953–unfinished)
Violin:
Violin Concerto No. 1 in D, Op. 19 (1916–17)
Violin Concerto No. 2 in G minor, Op. 63 (1935)
Cello:
Cello Concerto in E minor, Op. 58 (1933–38)
Symphony-Concerto for Cello and Orchestra in E minor, Op. 125 (1950–52)
Cello Concertino in G minor, Op. 132 (1953–unfinished) (one version completed by Kabalevsky, another by Vladimir Blok)

Vocal orchestral
Two Poems for Female Chorus and Orchestra, Op. 7 (1909–10)
The Ugly Duckling, Op. 18 (1914), for soprano and orchestra
Seven, They Are Seven, Op. 30 (1917–18, rev. 1933), cantata for tenor, chorus, and large orchestra
Melodie, Op. 35bis (1920), for female voice and orchestra
Vocal Suite from The Fiery Angel, Op. 37bis (1923, incomplete)
Peter and the Wolf, Op. 67 (1936), a children's story for narrator and orchestra
Cantata for the 20th Anniversary of the October Revolution, Op. 74 (1936–37), cantata for 2 choruses, orchestra, military band, accordion band, and percussion band
Songs of Our Days, Op. 76 (1937), for chorus and orchestra
Alexander Nevsky, Op. 78 (1939), cantata for mezzo-soprano, chorus, and orchestra
Zdravitsa, Op. 85 (1939), cantata for chorus and orchestra (also known as 'Hail to Stalin')
Ballad of an Unknown Boy, Op. 93 (1942–43), for soloists, chorus, and orchestra
Flourish, Mighty Land, Op. 114 (1947), cantata for chorus and orchestra
Winter Bonfire, Op. 122 (1949–50), for boy's choir and small orchestra
On Guard for Peace, Op. 124 (1950), cantata for chorus and orchestra

Choral
Six Songs, Op. 66 (1935)
Seven Songs and a March, Op. 89 (1941–42)
National Anthem and All-Union Hymn, Op. 98 (1943 and 1946)
Soldiers' Marching Song, Op. 121 (1950)

Songs
Two Poems, Op. 9 (1910–11)
The Ugly Duckling, Op. 18 (1914)
Five Poems, Op. 23 (1915)
Five Poems after Akhmatova, Op. 27 (1916)
Five Songs Without Words, Op. 35 (1920)
Five Poems after Bal'mont, Op. 36 (1921)
Five Kazakh Songs (1927)
Two Songs from Lieutenant Kijé, Op. 60bis (1934)
Three Children's Songs, Op. 68 (1936)
Three Romances after Pushkin, Op. 73 (1936)
Three Songs from Alexander Nevsky, Op. 78bis (1939)
Seven Songs, Op. 79 (1939)
Twelve Russian Folksongs, Op. 104 (1944)
Two Duets, Op. 106 (1945)
Broad and Deep the River Flows (1957)

Chamber music
Humoresque scherzo, Op. 12bis (1915) (for four bassoons)
Overture on Hebrew Themes, Op. 34 (1919) (for clarinet, string quartet and piano)
Quintet in G minor, Op. 39 (1924) (for oboe, clarinet, violin, viola and double bass)
String Quartet No. 1 in B minor, Op. 50 (1930) 
Sonata for Two Violins in C, Op. 56 (1932)
String Quartet No. 2 in F, Op. 92 (1941)

Instrumental
Violin
Five Melodies for Violin and Piano, Op. 35bis (1925)
Violin Sonata No. 1 in F minor, Op. 80 (1946)
Violin Sonata No. 2 in D, Op. 94a (1943; based on Flute Sonata in D, Op. 94)
Sonata for Solo Violin / Unison Violins in D, Op. 115 (1947)
Cello
Ballade for Cello and Piano, Op. 15 (1912)
Adagio for Cello and Piano, Op. 97bis (1944)
Cello Sonata in C, Op. 119 (1949)
Sonata for Solo Cello in C minor (completed posthumously by Vladimir Blok), Op. 134 (1952, completed 1972)
Flute
Flute Sonata in D, Op. 94 (1943)

Piano sonatas
Piano Sonatas – six juvenile: 1904, 1907 (revised for Op.1), 1907 (revised for Op.28), 1907–08, 1908 (revised for Op.29), 1908–09 
Piano Sonata No. 1 in F minor, Op. 1 (1907–09)
Piano Sonata No. 2 in D minor, Op. 14 (1912)
Piano Sonata No. 3 in A minor, Op. 28 (1907–17)
Piano Sonata No. 4 in C minor, Op. 29 (1908–17)
Piano Sonata No. 5 in C major (original version), Op. 38 (1923)
Piano Sonata No. 6 in A major, Op. 82 (1939–40)
Piano Sonata No. 7 in B major Stalingrad, Op. 83 (1939–42)
Piano Sonata No. 8 in B major, Op. 84 (1939–44)
Piano Sonata No. 9 in C major, Op. 103 (1947)
Piano Sonata No. 5 in C major (revised version), Op. 135 (1952–53)
Piano Sonata No. 10 in E minor, Op. 137 (unfinished) (1952)
Piano Sonata No. 11, Op. 138 (unrealized)

Other piano works
Four Etudes for Piano, Op. 2 (1909)
Four Pieces for Piano, Op. 3 (1911)
Four Pieces for Piano, Op. 4 (1910–12)
Toccata in D minor, Op. 11 (1912)
Ten Pieces for Piano, Op. 12 (1906–13)
Sarcasms, five pieces for piano, Op. 17 (1912–14)
Visions fugitives, 20 pieces for piano, Op. 22 (1915–17)
Tales of an Old Grandmother, Op. 31 (1918)
Four Pieces for Piano, Op. 32 (1918)
Schubert Waltzes (1920)
Fantasia on Scheherazade (1926)
Things in Themselves, 2 pieces for piano, Op. 45 (1928)
Six Pieces for Piano, Op. 52 (1928-31)
Two Sonatinas for Piano, Op. 54 (1931–32)
Three Pieces for Piano, Op. 59 (1933–34)
Pensées, 3 pieces for piano, Op. 62 (1933–34)
Music for Children, 12 easy pieces, Op. 65 (1935)
Dumka (after 1933)

Transcriptions for piano
March and Scherzo from "The Love for Three Oranges", Op. 33ter (1922)
Divertissement, Op. 43bis (1938)
Six Pieces for Piano, Op. 52 from a variety of sources (1930–31)
Ten Pieces from "Romeo and Juliet", Op. 75 (1937)
Gavotte from "Hamlet", Op. 77bis (1938)
Three Pieces from "Cinderella", Op. 95 (1942)
Three Pieces for Piano, Op. 96 from "War and Peace" and "Lermontov" (1941–42)
Ten Pieces from "Cinderella", Op. 97 (1943)
Six Pieces from "Cinderella", Op. 102 (1944)

Band music
Four Marches, Op. 69 (1935–37)
March in A, Op. 89bis (1941)
March in B, Op. 99 (1943–44) (Orchestral version transcribed by D. Wilson Ochoa, 2007)

By opus number

References

Prokofiev